The Anglican Diocese of Damaturu is one of ten within the Anglican Province of Jos, itself one of 14 provinces within the Church of Nigeria. The current bishop is Yohannah Audu. Abiodun Ogunyemi, Bishop of Damaturu, was translated to Zaria in July 2016.

References

Dioceses of the Province of Jos
 
Damaturu